State Trunk Highway 98 (often called Highway 98, STH-98 or WIS 98) is a state highway in the U.S. state of Wisconsin. It runs east–west in central Wisconsin from near Greenwood to Spencer.

Route description

WIS 98 starts at an intersection with WIS 73 south of Greenwood. From this terminus, the highway runs eastward through agricultural areas in rural Clark County. In the city of Loyal, WIS 98 follows South Street through residential neighborhoods to a junction with Main Street. There, the highway turns north along Main Street through the downtown area to an intersection with Elm Street. WIS 98 turns east again to follow Elm Street out of town, returning to rural farm land in the process. The highway then follows Coles Corner Road to a junction with County Trunk Highway Y (CTH-Y) near the Coles Cemetery, where WIS 98 turns north for about one mile (1.5 km). Curving back to an easterly path, the highway enters Spencer on Clark Street running through more residential neighborhoods. WIS 98 ends at the intersection in the middle of town with WIS 13 (Pacific Street).

History
WIS 98 was shown as a proposed highway on maps in 1921 between Argonne north to the Michigan state line. When the designation was applied to a roadway by 1924, it was designated instead along the current routing.

Major intersections

See also

References

External links

098
Transportation in Clark County, Wisconsin
Transportation in Marathon County, Wisconsin